Off Book: The Improvised Musical is a musical theatre podcast hosted by Jessica McKenna and Zach Reino. The show improvises a new musical every episode based on their guests' introduction. The show headlined at the 6th annual SteelStacks Improv Comedy Festival.

Background 
Zach Reino and Jessica McKenna met in 2011 at the Upright Citizens Brigade Theatre in Los Angeles, California. During each show, Jessica McKenna, Zach Reino, and a guest improvise an entire narrative musical while Scott Passarella plays the piano. Each week the musical is started out by their guest, and the rest of the show is based on the guest's introduction. Sometimes the guests do not have a background or experience with singing. The podcast was produced by Earwolf, but in 2021 the show moved to Art19 Media.

Live events 
The show was performed live on October 4, 2018 at the Dallas Comedy House in Deep Ellum. On October 5, 2018, the show performed live at Station Theatre's Trill Fest located in Houston, Texas. The show was performed live at the Charlotte Martin Theatre in Seattle during Bumbershoot on September 1, 2018  The show was performed live at the London Podcast festival in 2019. The show was performed at the Kansas City Improv Festival on August 16, 2019. The show headlined the 6th annual SteelStacks Improv Comedy Festival on January 25, 2019 in Bethlehem, Pennsylvannia.

Reception 
Roger Levesque gave one of their live performances four out of five stars in the Edmonton Journal. Tom Rainey praised the live episode titled "Forecast: Puberty Live! (With Nicole Byer and John Gemberling)" in Vulture saying that "the charm, charisma, and serious improv skills on display helped blow the roof off". The podcast was included on IndieWire's list of best podcasts in 2018 and 2019.

References

External links 
 

Audio podcasts
2017 podcast debuts
Improvisational podcasts
Comedy and humor podcasts
American podcasts
Musical theatre podcasts